iKONCERT 2016: Showtime Tour

iKONCERT 2016: Showtime Tour is the first Asian tour by South Korean boy band iKon, in support of their debut  studio album Welcome Back. The tour visited South Korea, Japan, China, Hong Kong, Taiwan, Thailand, Singapore, Malaysia and Indonesia. The tour began on January 30, 2016 in Seoul at Olympic Gymnastics Arena and ended on September 3, 2016 in Jakarta, Indonesia.

Background
Following iKON's Japanese debut on January 13, 2016, the band embarked on their first Japanese arena tour "iKONCERT: Showtime Tour in Japan 2016". Announced on October 5, 2015, the tour was originally set to visit 3 cities for an audience of 95,000. After adding 2 more cities, the tour gathered a total of 146,000 congert-goers from 14 shows: 8,000 from two shows in Fukuoka, 13,000 from Tokyo and 24,000 from Osaka.

On March 17, YG Entertainment announced 2 cities to commence iKon's Showtime Tour in Asia. The cities were Taiwan and Hong Kong. Afterwards, Chengdu, Nanjing, Shenzhen and Shanghai in China were included as well. The tour eventually expanded to include Thailand, Singapore, Malaysia and Indonesia.

Special guests
Akdong Musician
Lee Hi

Set list
This set list is representative of the show on January 31, 2017 in Seoul. It is not representative of all concerts for the duration of the tour.
 
 "Rhythm Ta Remix (Rock Version)"
 "Dumb & Dumber"
 "Sinosijak"
 "Be I" (B.I Solo)
 "Go" (Bobby Solo)
 "Anthem"
 "Apology"
 "Wait For Me"
 "Airplane"
 "Bang Bang Bang" (cover BigBang)
 "Me Gustas Tu" (Jinhwan) (cover GFriend)
 "Up & Down" (cover EXID)
 "I'm Different" (feat. Bobby) (Hi Suhyun)
 "M.U.P"
 "I Miss You So Bad"
 "My Type"
 "Today"
 "What's Wrong?"
 "Just Another Boy"
 "Climax"
Encore
 "Long Time No See"
 "Welcome Back"
 "My Type"
 "Dumb & Dumber"

Concerts Dates

Notes

References

2016 concert tours
Concert tours of Asia
IKon concert tours